The Speaker of the Irish House of Commons was the presiding officer of the Irish House of Commons until its disestablishment in 1800.

In the absence of a government chosen from and answerable to the Commons, the Speaker was the dominant political figure in the Parliament of Ireland. Unlike in modern British and Irish parliamentary practice, the Speaker was not expected to be politically impartial and several Speakers held government or Crown-appointed positions while also presiding over the Commons. Even so, the conduct of everyday business in the House was generally overseen with impartiality and fairness by all holders of the Speakership. The position was one of considerable power and prestige in Ireland, and the holder enjoyed high precedence as the first gentleman in Ireland.

Speakers of the Commons were elected on the first day of the session of a new parliament, unless the sitting Speaker resigned his post. Before the reign of Queen Anne elections to the chair were uncontested. However, the House increasingly reflected the virulent political divisions between Whig and Tory factions, and Alan Brodrick's second candidacy was contested in 1713. Further contested elections occurred in 1771, 1776 and 1790.

From 1771 the Speaker had a considerable degree of independence from the government of the Lord Lieutenant of Ireland, although the Speaker was regularly consulted on the executive's business. Speakers needed to have considerable wealth to carry out their conventional roles as sources of patronage in Ireland, and the Speaker was expected to host all Members of Parliament several times year. The Speaker held the casting vote when the House divided as primus inter pares.

The position was abolished when the Parliament of Ireland was merged with that of Great Britain to form the Parliament of the United Kingdom following the Acts of Union 1800. The last Speaker was John Foster, who had been a vehement opponent of the Union while in the chair.

List of speakers

References

Ireland
Parliament of Ireland